The 2009 COSAFA U-20 Cup is an association football tournament contested between national teams affiliated to COSAFA.

Participants

Group A

Group B

Group C

Group D

Groups

Group A

Group B

Group C

Group D

Knock-out Stage

Semi finals

Third Place Playoff

Final

External links
COSAFA Website

References

2009
2009–10 in South African soccer
2009 in African football
2009